Edgar Ramón Muñoz Mata (born December 22, 1983) is a boxer from Venezuela, who participated in the 2004 Summer Olympics for his native South American country.

Muñoz won the bronze medal in the same division in 2003 at the Pan American Games in Santo Domingo. He qualified for the Olympic Games by ending up in first place at the 1st AIBA American 2004 Olympic Qualifying Tournament in Tijuana, Mexico.

At the Olympics he upset Marijo Šivolija but was eliminated 10–18 in the second round of the Light heavyweight (81 kg) division by eventual Belarusian runner-up: Magomed Aripgadjiev.

In 2019 he represented Venezuela at the 2019 Military World Games and he won a bronze medal in the men's +91 kg event.

External links
 
  (2016)
  (2016)
  (2004)
  (2004)
 
 

1983 births
Living people
Venezuelan male boxers
Heavyweight boxers
Olympic boxers of Venezuela
Boxers at the 2004 Summer Olympics
Boxers at the 2016 Summer Olympics
Pan American Games bronze medalists for Venezuela
Pan American Games medalists in boxing
Boxers at the 2003 Pan American Games
Boxers at the 2015 Pan American Games
South American Games silver medalists for Venezuela
South American Games medalists in boxing
Competitors at the 2002 South American Games
Central American and Caribbean Games bronze medalists for Venezuela
Competitors at the 2014 Central American and Caribbean Games
Central American and Caribbean Games medalists in boxing
Medalists at the 2003 Pan American Games
Medalists at the 2015 Pan American Games
20th-century Venezuelan people
21st-century Venezuelan people